Neville Christian is a Norfolk Island politician, and was Minister for Finance in the Twelfth Norfolk Legislative Assembly which took office on 28 March 2007.

He held responsibilities for Public Monies, Government Business Enterprises, Airlines (Norfolk Air), Customs & Emergency Management.

References

External links

Year of birth missing (living people)
Living people
Members of the Norfolk Legislative Assembly
People from Norfolk Island